Mi Destino Eres Tú (English: You Are my Destiny) is a Mexican telenovela produced by Carla Estrada for Televisa that premiered on July 10, 2000 and ended on November 10, 2000. It had an original argument Carmen Daniels and Jorge Lozano Soriano who wrote a melodrama of unique features thanks to its plot full of passion, family secrets, crimes and murders, mobsters. Lucero sang the main theme and it was a hit throughout Latin America. It was released in the album Mi destino. It stars Lucero, Jorge Salinas, Susana Zabaleta and Jaime Camil.

Plot 
Andrea San Vicente is a young lawyer who is modern and intelligent. She has a passion for justice and the rights take her to defend those who can't defend for themselves. That same passion will lead her to her past, which she doesn't know anything about.

Andrea lives in a house in a private section of the middle class in Mexico City with her uncle Anselmo, her aunt Zulema, her younger sister Gina, and her cousin Magda. Zulema has told the girls that the parents of Andrea and Gina, Enrique and Alicia, died in an accident. But the reality is another.

Andrea and her sister have grown up in a family in which Zulema tells them they should be grateful for. After all, they were given a family, and they were educated. This makes Andrea the main source for money in the family, since her uncle Anselmo has had diabetes for years this doesn't allow him to work.

Andrea falls in love with Ramiro, a young man of better economic position than her. They are about to marry, but they have to confront many obstacles: the rounding opposition of Samuel, who is Ramiro's father, and the lies and intrigues of Sofia, an ex-girlfriend of Ramiro.

Andrea and Ramiro eventually get over all those obstacles and finally get married. But the destiny has a cruel game for the two: during their honeymoon, and after having consummated the marriage, Ramiro dies all of a sudden and leaves Andrea in a dark loneliness. Andrea has become a widow and being so young, and now, she has to confront a destiny she never expected.

Andrea has taken refuge in her work and her studies, since she is doing a master's degree in psychology. Not only has she buried Ramiro, but all her possibilities to love have gone with him.....or at least that is what she thinks. Without looking for it, and without thinking it, two men of distinct character will come into her life: Mauricio Rodriguez and Eduardo Rivadeneira, but only one of them will be her destiny.

Cast
 
Lucero as Andrea San Vicente
Jorge Salinas as Don Eduardo Rivadeneira del Encino
Susana Zabaleta as Emma Pimentel
Jaime Camil as Mauricio Rodríguez Calderón
Sylvia Pasquel as Zulema Fernández de Sánchez
Julio Alemán as Augusto Rodríguez Franco
Natalia Streignard as Sofía Devesa Leyva
Azela Robinson as Isaura Becker
Cynthia Klitbo as Amara Trujillo
Jorge Reynoso as Genaro Gil
Jorge Muñiz as Father Rodrigo
Orlando Carrio as Enrique San Vicente Ordóñez
Patsy as Claudia
Dalilah Polanco as Noemí
Jacqueline Andere as Nuria del Encino de Rivadeneira
Jorge Vargas as Héctor Valderrama
Lorena Herrera as Olga Ramos Moret
Magda Guzmán as Nanny Nina
Carmelita González as Asunción Rivadeneira
Jan as Fernando Rivadeneira del Encino
Miguel Ángel Biaggio as César Becker-Rodríguez
Luis Bayardo as Samuel Galindo Betancourt
Raymundo Capetillo as Sergio Rivadeneira
Silvia Mariscal as María Suárez de Galindo
Hector Ortega as Anselmo Sánchez Pérez
Ana María Aguirre as Teresa "Tere" Del Alba de Legorreta
Anthony Álvarez as Luis
Guillermo Aguilar as Gaspar Linares Saval
Raúl Buenfil as Héctor
Amparo Arozamena as Chonita
Silvia Eugenia Derbez as Juliana Rodríguez Calderón
Miguel Galván as Evaristo Reyes Hernández
Mariana Karr as Irene
Lucero León as Elena Pimentel
Sheyla as Celia López Hernández
Sherlyn González as Georgina "Gina" San Vicente Fernández
Abraham Stavans as Francisco Canseco
Andrea Torre as Magdalena "Magda" Sánchez Fernández
Andrea Lagunes as Ximena Rivadeneira Pimentel
Cosme Alberto as Juan "Juancho" Reyes Solís
Joaquín Cordero as José Ignacio Rivadeneira Orendáin
María Sorté as Amparo  Calderón de Rodríguez
Gabrielle Báez as Diana Solís de Reyes
Raúl Castellanos as Alfredo Ramírez Ortiz
Gabriel de Cervantes as Marco Ramírez Ortiz
Fernanda Chabat as Viviana "Vivi" Legorreta del Alba
Sara Monar as Paquita
María Dolores Oliva as Margarita
Alejandra Ortega as Laura
Susy-Lu Peña as Guadalupe "Lupita" Reyes Solís
Andrés Puente Jr. as Ricardo Reyes Solís
Yessica Salazar as Lourdes "Lulú"
Gabriel Soto as Nicolás
Sergio Zaldívar as Daniel Salazar
Fernanda Ruidos as Sonia Arizmendi
Francisco Avendaño as Gustavo Becker
Vicente Herrera as Detective Zúñiga
 Mauricio Islas as Ramiro Juárez
Michelle Ramaglia as Wedding guest
Elizabeth Álvarez
Juan Alfonso Baptista as Nicolas Friend

Guest stars
Jerry Rivera as Himself
Jon Secada as Himself

Awards

References

External links

20 questions to Susana Zabaleta

2000 telenovelas
Mexican telenovelas
2000 Mexican television series debuts
2000 Mexican television series endings
Spanish-language telenovelas
Television shows set in Mexico City
Televisa telenovelas